Anadia is a municipality located in the state of Alagoas. Its population is 17,526 (2020) and its area is 189 km².

References

Municipalities in Alagoas